William Alexander McArthur (1857 – 7 June 1923), was a British Liberal politician and businessman.

Biography
McArthur was born in Sydney, Australia, the eldest son of Alexander McArthur and his wife Maria Bowden, the second daughter of the Rev. William B. Boyce. McArthur's father was a businessman and politician in Australia and England, becoming MP for Leicester. McArthur was educated privately.

On 12 August 1890 at the Trinity Wesleyan Church, Abingdon-on-Thames, Berkshire, he married Florence Creemer (died 24 October 1940), the third daughter of John Creemer Clarke of Wayste Court, Abingdon, and the couple had one son and two daughters.

He worked as a merchant like his father, and became a partner in the firm of W. and A. McArthur, Colonial Merchants. He was a Director of the Bank of Australasia. He was Mas Commr. for New South Wales at the Colonial and Indian Exhibition in 1886.

McArthur was elected to Parliament for Buckrose at the 1886 general election, with a majority of a single vote, but was unseated on a scrutiny being held and the seat was awarded to the Conservative candidate, Christopher Sykes.  He entered Parliament for St Austell in an 1887 by-election, a seat he held until 1908. McArthur served in the Liberal administrations of William Ewart Gladstone and the Earl of Rosebery as a Junior Lord of the Treasury from 1892 to 1895.

McArthur died on 7 June 1923 at a private hospital in Sydney, aged 66, and was interred 8 June at South Head Cemetery.

References

External links 

1857 births
1923 deaths
Politicians from Cornwall
Liberal Party (UK) MPs for English constituencies
UK MPs 1886–1892
UK MPs 1892–1895
UK MPs 1895–1900
UK MPs 1900–1906
UK MPs 1906–1910
Members of the Parliament of the United Kingdom for constituencies in Cornwall
Politicians from Sydney